Endurance GB is the governing body for endurance riding in Great Britain as well as organising over 100 affiliated events per year. It is one of the 16 organisations which form part of the British Equestrian Federation.

External links
 Endurance GB official website

References

Equestrian organizations
Equestrian sports in the United Kingdom
Sports governing bodies in the United Kingdom